Langhorne Creek wine region is a wine region in South Australia that is located on the plains southeast of the town of Strathalbyn along the lower reaches of the Bremer River and Angas River to Lake Alexandrina.

Extent and appellation
The Langhorne Creek wine region is one of five wine regions forming the Fleurieu zone which is located to the south of Adelaide city centre in South Australia.  The Langhorne Creek wine region extends southeast of the town of Strathalbyn along the Bremer River and Angas River to Lake Alexandrina, centred on the town of Langhorne Creek.  
The term ‘Langhorne Creek’ was registered as an AGI on 16 October 1998.

Grapes and wine
As of 2014, the region is reported as having 24 wineries.

See also

South Australian wine

Citations and references

Citations

References

External links
Langhorne Creek Wine Industry Council Inc. website
Langhorne Creek Wine Region South Australian Tourism Bureau homepage

Wine regions of South Australia